José Eduardo Granda Vicuña (born March 18, 1984) is an Ecuadorian footballer currently playing for Deportivo Cuenca.

Club career
Granda started his professional career at Deportivo Cuenca when he was 16. He rarely got to play with the first team by the end of the season as he only got two appearances. He was loaned out to LDU Cuenca for the next season, where he got more chances of regular playing. After two seasons with Liga de Cuenca, he was again loaned out to Técnico Universitario for one season. He made 27 appearances for Técnico where he impressed Deportivo Cuenca at the end of the season. Granda came back to Deportivo Cuenca, this time to play as a starter. In the Copa Libertadores 2009, he was an important player for Cuenca and was named Man of the Match in their 4-0 win against Guaraní.

1984 births
Living people
People from Cuenca, Ecuador
Association football midfielders
Ecuadorian footballers
C.D. Técnico Universitario footballers
C.D. Cuenca footballers